Scrub Creek is a rural locality in the Somerset Region, Queensland, Australia.

Geography
The Brisbane River flows through the south-western corner. Dayspring Creek enters from the east, becomes Scrub Creek in the centre, and flows into the Brisbane River in the south-east.

The Brisbane Valley Highway passes to the south-west of the locality.

History 
Scrub Creek State School opened circa 1933. It closed in 1955. It was at 238 Scrub Creek Road.

Education 
There are no schools in Scrub Creek. The nearest government primary schools are Toogoolawah State School in Toogoolawah to the south and Harlin State School in Harlin to the north-west. The nearest government secondary schools are Toogoolawah State High School in Toogoolawah to the south and Kilcoy State High School in Kilcoy to the north-east.

References

Further reading 

  — also includes Mount Beppo State School, Ivorys Creek Provisional School, Cross Roads Provisional School, Ottaba Provisional School, Murrumba State School, Mount Esk Pocket School, Kipper Provisional School, Lower Cressbrook School, Fulham School, Sandy Gully State School, Cooeeimbardi State School, Scrub Creek State School

Suburbs of Somerset Region
Localities in Queensland